The Return of Spring is a painting by William-Adolphe Bouguereau created in 1886. It is among the more well-known of his works. It is currently in the collection of the Joslyn Art Museum in Omaha, Nebraska, and was acquired in 1951 as the gift of Francis T. B. Martin.  The painting was brought to Omaha shortly after it was completed by George W. Lininger.  Lininger was an art collector and private gallery owner who routinely opened his gallery to the public for no charge.   

The painting was physically attacked twice - in 1890 and in 1976. Both times, damages were minimal. The attackers were offended by the painting's overtly sensual nudity.

A replica of the painting appeared in the ballroom scene at the Beaufort home in the 1993 film, The Age of Innocence (though the film takes place in the 1870s, years before the painting was created).

See also
William-Adolphe Bouguereau gallery

References

External links
William-Adolphe Bouguereau at the Web Museum
Le Printemps at the Joslyn Art Museum
The Return of Spring Hanging in the Lininger Gallery

Paintings by William-Adolphe Bouguereau
1886 paintings
Nude art
Paintings of Cupid
Paintings in Nebraska